Sırıklı can refer to:

 Sırıklı, Bekilli
 Sırıklı, Çorum